Visheh Sara may refer to:
 Visheh Sara, Rezvanshahr
 Visheh Sara, Sowme'eh Sara